Diary of a Married Woman is a 1953 West German comedy film directed by Josef von Báky and starring Maria Schell, O. W. Fischer and Margarete Haagen.

The film's sets were designed by Hans Jürgen Kiebach and Gabriel Pellon. It was shot at the Göttingen Studios in Lower Saxony.

Cast
Maria Schell as Barbara Holzmann
O. W. Fischer as Paul Holzmann
Margarete Haagen as Oma Sanitätsrat
Franco Andrei as Nicola
Ernst Schroder as Dr. Hugendübel
Willy Reichert as Hotelportier
Erna Sellmer as Frau Bumke
Hans Stiebner as Herr Krause
Ute Sielisch as Fräulein Käthi
Rudolf Kalvius as Oberkellner
Gerd Sylla as Karli
Hermann Pfeiffer as Standesbeamte

References

External links

1953 comedy films
German comedy films
West German films
Films directed by Josef von Báky
Films based on German novels
German black-and-white films
1950s German films
Films shot at Göttingen Studios
1950s German-language films